The 2020 FA Women's League Cup Final was the ninth final of the FA Women's League Cup, England's secondary cup competition for women's football teams and its primary League Cup tournament. It took place on 29 February 2020 at the City Ground, and was contested by Arsenal and Chelsea.

Arsenal have competed in all but one (2016) of the previous finals, winning five. Chelsea made their first appearance in a League Cup final having been a losing semi-finalist at the hands of Manchester City in each of the last two seasons.

Route to the final

Arsenal 
Arsenal topped their League Cup Group for the second consecutive season, doing so by winning four of their five games; against second-tier teams London City Lionesses, Charlton Athletic and London Bees as well as FA WSL relegation battlers Bristol City. The only team to stop Arsenal from winning in the Group Stage was fellow WSL side Brighton & Hove Albion who earned themselves a goalless draw before the Seagulls also took the extra available point by winning the ensuing penalty shootout 4–2. Arsenal finished the Group Stage without conceding a goal.

The quarter-finals saw Arsenal drawn at home to Reading as their strong defensive record continued, seeing off the midtable WSL side 1–0 thanks to a late Kim Little strike. The semi-final matched Arsenal against defending League Cup champions and fellow WSL title-challengers Manchester City. A 2–0 Arsenal lead at half-time was halved in the 60th minute as Gemma Bonner scored the first goal Arsenal had conceded in the competition but the Gunners held on for the win, sending them to their third consecutive final.

Chelsea 
Chelsea topped their League Cup Group for the third consecutive season, and, like Arsenal, progressed with 13 points after winning four of the five games and drawing a fifth before losing the penalty shootout. They beat two WSL teams and two second-tier teams by way of West Ham United, Tottenham Hotspur, Crystal Palace and Lewes before Reading forced a 1–1 draw. The Royals won the extra point 4–2 on penalties.

In the quarter-finals, Chelsea were drawn at home to Aston Villa, one of two Championship teams to progress to the knockout stage. Chelsea ran out comfortable 3–1 winners. The Blues' place in their first League Cup final was ultimately assured by a sole Maren Mjelde goal as Chelsea once again narrowly beat newly-promoted Manchester United 1–0 in the semi-final, a repeat of the scoreline when the teams had first met in the league in November 2019.

Match

Details

References

Cup
FA Women's Super League Cup finals
FA Women's League Cup Final
FAWLC 2020
FA Women's League Cup Final, 2020